Shanhaiguan District, formerly Shan-hai-kwan or Shan-hai-kuan, is a district of the city of Qinhuangdao, Hebei Province, China, named after the pass of the Great Wall within the district, Shanhai Pass.

Administrative divisions 

There are five subdistricts, three towns, and one township, Bohai Township, in the district.

Subdistricts 
 Nanguan Subdistrict
 Dongjie Subdistrict
 Xijie Subdistrict
 Lunan Subdistrict
 Chuanchang Road Subdistrict

Towns 
 Diyiguan
 Shihe
 Mengjiang

Climate 
The climate is hot-summer humid continental with a monsoon pattern (Dwa:).

References

External links 
 Shanhaiguan District official website

County-level divisions of Hebei
Qinhuangdao